The HSBC Canada building is a 23-storey office tower in the city's downtown core of Vancouver, British Columbia, Canada. The building's primary tenant is the headquarters of HSBC Bank Canada, the Canadian subsidiary of HSBC. The skyscraper, built on the site of the former Hotel Devonshire, was originally designed by WZMH Architects for the Bank of British Columbia. The assets of the Bank of British Columbia were acquired by HSBC Bank Canada in 1986. 

The building's lobby features a gigantic magnetically induced pendulum artwork entitled "The Pendulum" by Alan Storey. The building has been home to HSBC Canada since 1987.

See also
List of tallest buildings in Vancouver

References

Emporis.com: HSBC Canada building

HSBC buildings and structures
Bank headquarters in Canada
Postmodern architecture in Canada
Skyscrapers in Vancouver
WZMH Architects buildings
Skyscraper office buildings in Canada
Office buildings completed in 1986
1987 establishments in British Columbia